Claire Nichols  (born 7 August 1975) is an Australian former footballer who played as a goalkeeper for the Australia women's national soccer team. She competed at the 1994 OFC Women's Championship and 1995 FIFA Women's World Cup. At the club level, she played for Liverpool (NSW) in Australia.

References

External links 
 

1975 births
Living people
Australian women's soccer players
Australia women's international soccer players
Place of birth missing (living people)
1995 FIFA Women's World Cup players
Women's association football goalkeepers